Umarex Sportwaffen GmbH & Co. KG is a German manufacturer of air guns (including Umarex air pistols such as the Beretta Elite II), tear-gas and signal pistols, paintball markers under the RAM brand and airsoft guns, based in Arnsberg, North Rhine-Westphalia. The firm was founded in 1972. Its United States subsidiary headquarter is located in Fort Smith, Arkansas.

In 1993 the Carl Walther GmbH firm was acquired by Umarex, who continued to manufacture under the Walther name in Ulm and Arnsberg. In 2010, Röhm Gesellschaft, the firearms division of Röhm GmbH was also acquired.

Umarex USA 
The North American subsidiary of Umarex, Umarex USA, was created in 2006 after acquiring the American marketers of the RWS brand (formerly part of Dynamit Nobel), which they continue to market.  Umarex USA markets Umarex airguns in addition to many other airguns under license from various firearm brands that include Beretta, Browning, Colt, Hammerli, HK, Makarov, Ruger, Smith & Wesson, UZI, Walther and Glock. Umarex USA entered the tactical rimfire market in 2009 with the importation of Walther-made Colt M4 and M16 .22 LR guns. The company has in-house brands including entry and mid-level airsoft guns in their Tactical Force and Combat Zone brands, while reserving their Elite Force  brand for premium airsoft guns. The Legends line is based on historical guns in a BB or pellet airgun format. In late 2010, the company began offering a Turkish-made M1911A1 chambered in .45 ACP under the Regent brand.

Products

Umarex Sportwaffen GmbH & Co.

Spring piston 
 DX17
 Trevox
 Patrol
 Syrix

Pump pneumatic 
 Strike Point

CO2 
Pistol
 CPS
 RP5
 TDP45
 HPP
 SA10
 Racegun
 Tornado
Rifle
 850 M2
 XBG

Firearms - Pistol 
 FN 502

Umarex USA

Pistol 
 Strike Point
 Trevox
 XBG Carbine
 DX17
 T.A.C.
 TDP45
 XBG
 Brodax
 MCP
 SA10
 Glock 19
 Beretta M9
 Walther PPQ

Rifle 

 A-Rex
 Embark
 Forge
 Fuel
 Fusion
 Gauntlet
 Gauntlet 2
 Hammer
 NXG APX
 Octane/Octane Elite
 Surge
 SurgeMax
 Synergis
 Throttle
 Torq

References

External links 
Official Umarex site
Official Umarex USA site

Companies based in North Rhine-Westphalia
Manufacturing companies established in 1972
Firearm manufacturers of Germany
1972 establishments in West Germany